The  was a championship established and promoted by New Japan Pro-Wrestling. It was New Japan Pro-Wrestling's version of the All Asia Heavyweight Championship. Tiger Jeet Singh was the first and only champion, winning the title on July 29, 1976 in Osaka, Japan by defeating Seiji Sakaguchi. He successfully defended the title two times, against Seiji Sakaguchi on June 29, 1977 in Osaka and against Strong Kobayashi on July 21, 1977 in Sendai. The title was retired on April 23, 1981 due to an announcement of the IWGP, a new governing body, which would promote their own-branded championships.

Title history

References 

New Japan Pro-Wrestling championships
Continental professional wrestling championships
Heavyweight wrestling championships